Rudi Gores (born 5 September 1957) is a German former professional football player and coach.

Career
Born in Gerolstein, Gores started his professional career with Borussia Mönchengladbach in 1976, having in the youth played for SV Gerolstein. He did not reach starter status in Mönchengladbach's then top-team but won the German Championship in 1977 and the UEFA Cup in 1979. After the 1979–80 season he transferred to MSV Duisburg, which he left after relegation in 1982 for Fortuna Düsseldorf. In summer 1983, he transferred to SC Fortuna Köln, subsequently playing for the other second division sides Tennis Borussia Berlin and Viktoria Aschaffenburg. In 98 games in the Bundesliga he scored 16 goals.

In the first half of the 1990s, he coached Viktoria Aschaffenburg in the fourth-tier Oberliga Hessen. From 1995 to 1997 he coached Rot-Weiss Essen and achieved promotion to the 2. Bundesliga in 1996 but was fired during the season. On 1 July 1997, Gores signed a contract with third-tier FC Rot-Weiß Erfurt, playing in the Regionalliga Süd. Due to financial problems, he was fired after only 17 days. He then became manager of Wuppertaler SV but had a difficult standing with the supporters due to his sympathies for Rot-Weiss Essen and was fired in January 1999 after two unsuccessful years. In August 2005 he accepted Bernd Krauss' offer to work as assistant coach for Baniyas Abu Dhabi. In April 2006, he followed Krauss as assistant coach to the Spanish side CD Tenerife where both coaches were fired on 4 December 2006 due to lack of success.

Honours 
 Bundesliga: 1976–77
 UEFA Cup: 1978–79

References

External links 
 

1957 births
Living people
People from Gerolstein
German footballers
Bundesliga players
2. Bundesliga players
Borussia Mönchengladbach players
MSV Duisburg players
Fortuna Düsseldorf players
SC Fortuna Köln players
Tennis Borussia Berlin players
Viktoria Aschaffenburg players
German football managers
Viktoria Aschaffenburg managers
Rot-Weiss Essen managers
FC Rot-Weiß Erfurt managers
UEFA Cup winning players
Association football forwards
Footballers from Rhineland-Palatinate
FC Wegberg-Beeck managers
West German footballers